The 2021–22 SBL season is the 64th season of the premier Syrian  Basketball League and the 2nd season under the current play-off format. In the regular season, teams play against each other home-and-away in a round-robin format. The matchdays were from 9 December 2021 to 6 May 2022.

Al-Karamah SC was the defending champion which was swept by Al-Ittihad in the finals. Al-Ittihad won their 20th title earning their first title since the 2005–06 season.

Clubs
Huteen SC and Al-Fayhaa are promoted to SBL, replacing Al-Yarmouk and Ouroube SC. 

2021–22 teams:

Regular season

Play-offs
The SBL playoffs semifinals and finals were best of five formats. The play off started on 18 May 2022 and ended on 13 June 2022.

Finals
The higher-seeded team played the first, second and fifth leg (if necessary) at home.

|}

Winning roster
Al-Ittihad Aleppo 2021–22 roster
 Coach : Fuad Abou Chakra
 Players : Anthony Bakar, Nadim Issa, Wael Jlilaty, Ali Diarbakerli, Antwan Scott, Isaac Oubeid, Jamil Sadir, Abdulwahab Al-Hamwi, Mohamed Harat, Michael Madanly, Saleh Tofek

Syrian clubs in Asian/Arab competitions
FIBA Asia Champions Cup: Cancelled
West Asia Super League: Al-Ittihad  SC, Al-Karamah SC
Arab Club Basketball Championship: Al-Ittihad  SC

References

Basketball leagues in Asia
Lebanese